Yuvileine is a village located in Kherson Raion, Kherson Oblast, Ukraine, south-east of the town of Oleshky. It hosts the administration of the Yuvileine rural hromada, one of the hromadas of Ukraine.

Geography 
The village is situated 48 km south east of the administrative centre of the oblast, the city of Kherson, and is 8 km south east of the Oleshky Sands National Nature Park. It has an area of 2 km2 and a population of approximately 1,558 people.

Administrative status 
Until July 2020, Yuvileine was in the Oleshky Raion of Kherson Oblast. The raion was abolished in July 2020 as a result of the administrative reform of Ukraine's districts, which reduced the number of raions of Kherson Oblast to five, merging Oleshky Raion into Kherson Raion.

Russian invasion and occupation 
When Russia invaded Ukraine, most of Kherson Oblast was captured along with Yuvileine which was captured on the first day of the war, 24 February 2022. The western part of the Oblast, including Kherson and all settlements west of the Dnipro river, were liberated by the Ukrainian Armed Forces, on 10 November and 11 November 2022. However, as of February 2023, the village remains occupied by Russian forces.

References 

Villages in Kherson Raion